Sharon Yaish is an Israeli director and editor known for her documentary film A Whore Like Me (2019).

Career 
Sharon Yaish is an Israeli director and editor who wrote and co-directed Israeli documentary film A Whore Like Me, which revolves around the life of a Hungarian woman named Csilla, who was abducted and sold to a prostitution ring in Israel. The film was praised by critics, one of whom called  "one of the most important films ever made about prostitution. The film won Ophir Award for Best Documentary under 60 minutes and was nominated for Best Israeli Film in Docaviv Film Festival.

Sharon Yaish earlier won the Best Editing Award in Docaviv Film Festival for the film Elish's Notebooks in the year 2017.

Filmography

Director 
 A Whore Like Me - 2019

Writer 

 God Deserves a House - 2018
 The Rabbi from Hezbollah - 2019
 A Whore Like Me - 2019

Editor 
 Broke - 2015
 Don't Call Me Cute -  2016
 Elish's Notebooks - 2017
 God Deserves a House - 2018 
 A Whore Like Me (Documentary) - 2019
 The Rabbi from Hezbollah -  2019

References

External links 
 

Living people
Israeli documentary film directors
Ophir Award Winners
Year of birth missing (living people)
Israeli women film directors

he:שרון יעיש